The Italian Artistic Gymnastics Championships are the highest-level individual competition in artistic gymnastics in Italy. The first edition was held in 1925.

The championships are organized by the Italian Gymnastics Federation (FGI) and include men's and women's competitions in standard gymnastics disciplines.

The championships are called "assoluti" ("absolute") in the sense that all gymnasts, with no distinction between juniors and seniors, can compete in them. The winner claims the title of "Champion of Italy".

History 
In 1977 the sports club Ginnastica Romana proposed to combine the male and female championships, for the first time in Italy alternating men's events with women's ones.

Winners

References 

 

Gymnastics competitions in Italy
Italy
Gymnastics